Campiglossa absinthii is a species of fly in the family Tephritidae, the gall flies. The species is found in the Palearctic. The larvae feed on Asteraceae, including Artemisia maritima and Artemisia vulgaris.

References

Tephritinae
Insects described in 1805
Diptera of Europe
Taxa named by Johan Christian Fabricius